Oberaach railway station is a railway station in the village of Oberaach, within the municipality of Amriswil, in the Swiss canton of Thurgau. It is an intermediate stop on the Winterthur–Romanshorn line and is served by local trains only.

Services 
Oberaach is served by the S10 of the St. Gallen S-Bahn:

 : half-hourly service from Wil to Romanshorn.

References

External links 
 

Railway stations in the canton of Thurgau
Swiss Federal Railways stations